BIFA may refer to:
British Independent Film Awards
British International Freight Association
Black imported fire ant